Christa Striezel (born 28 July 1949) is a German athlete. She competed in the women's long jump at the 1976 Summer Olympics.

References

1949 births
Living people
Athletes (track and field) at the 1976 Summer Olympics
German female long jumpers
Olympic athletes of West Germany
Athletes from Hamburg